The Deruga Case is a 1938 German crime drama film directed by Fritz Peter Buch and starring Willy Birgel, Geraldine Katt and Dagny Servaes. It is based on the 1917 novel of the same title by Ricarda Huch. It was shot at the Babelsberg Studios in Potsdam. The film's sets were designed by the art directors Wilhelm Depenau and Ludwig Reiber.

Cast
 Willy Birgel as Dr. Stefan Deruga
 Geraldine Katt as Baroness Mingo Truschkowitz
 Dagny Servaes as Baronin Truschkowitz
 Georg Alexander as Baron Truschkowitz
 Käthe Haack as Marta Schwertfeger
 Claire Winter as Ursula Züger
 Hans Leibelt as Justizrat Dr. Klemm
 Erich Fiedler as Dr. Schelling
 Paul Bildt as Landgerichtsvorsitzender Dr. Zeunemann
 Walter Franck as Senior Prosecutor
 Ernst Karchow as Prosecutor Dr. Noth
 Erika von Thellmann as Therese Klinkhardt
 Roma Bahn as Valeska Durich
 Fritz Odemar as Hofrat Dr. Mäulchen
 Leo Peukert as Verzelli
 Erich Ziegel as Professor Vandermühl
 Oscar Sabo as Hausmeister Schulz
 Beppo Brem as Friseur Alfinger
 Walter Albrecht as 1. Geschworener
 Otto Braml as 1. Gerichtswachtmeister
 Walter Buhse as 2 Geschworener
 Loulou Daenner as 2. Journalistin
 Jac Diehl as Justizwachtmeister
 Josefine Dora as Garderobiere
 Peter Erkelenz as Sachverständiger
 Wilhelm Große as 6. Geschworener
 Christine Großmann as 1. Journalistin
 Kurt Hagen as 2. Gerichtswachtmeister
 Bruno Klockmann as 3. Geschworener
 William Leo as Protokollführer
 Karin Luesebrink as Zuschauerin bei der Gerichtsverhandlung
 Guenther Markert as 2. Journalist
 Otto Marle as 4. Geschworener
 Edith Meinhard as Serviererin
 Hugo Meissl as Prozesszeichner
 Hans Nerking as 1. Beisitzer
 Alfred Pussert as 3. Journalist
 Louis Ralph as Kriminalbeamter
 Leo Reiter as 5. Geschworener
 Arthur Reppert as Zuschauer bei der Gerichtsverhandlung
 Jutta Sabo as Zuschauerin bei der Gerichtsverhandlung
 Ernst Albert Schaach Diener Fredrich
 Willi Schaeffers as Privatdetektiv
 Walter Schenk as 4. Journalist
 S.O. Schoening as 2. Beisitzer
 Wera Schultz as Zuschauerin bei der Gerichtsverhandlung
 Alfred Stratmann as Zuschauer bei der Gerichtsverhandlung =
 Tommy Thomas as Zuschauer bei der Gerichtsverhandlung
 Bruno Tillessen as Gast im Café
 Egon Vogel as 5. Journalist
 Jens von Hagen as 1. Journalist
 Hubert von Meyerinck as Riedmüller
 Walter Werner as Sanitätsrat Dr. Gürtner

References

Bibliography 
 Klaus, Ulrich J. Deutsche Tonfilme: Jahrgang 1938. Klaus-Archiv, 1988.
 Moeller, Felix. The Film Minister: Goebbels and the Cinema in the Third Reich. Axel Menges, 2000.

External links 
 

1938 films
1938 crime films
German crime films
1938 drama films
German drama films
Films of Nazi Germany
1930s German-language films
Films directed by Fritz Peter Buch
Films based on German novels
German courtroom films
Films about euthanasia
UFA GmbH films
German black-and-white films
1930s German films
Films shot at Babelsberg Studios